DeWitt Thompson Weaver Sr. (May 11, 1912 – January 19, 1998) was an American football player, coach, and college athletics administrator.  He served as the head football coach of the Texas Tech Red Raiders from 1951 to 1960.

He was the first head football coach at Texas Tech to win a bowl game during his first season—an accomplishment unmatched at Texas Tech until Tommy Tuberville's first season, in 2010.

In 1956, he became the first college coach to defeat the Texas Longhorns in a season-opener in Austin. He amassed a 49–51–5 record.

From 1952 to 1960, he also served as the athletic director at Texas Technological College, as Texas Tech University was then known.

His son, DeWitt Jr., is a professional golfer who won twice on the PGA Tour.

Head coaching record

References

1912 births
1998 deaths
American football guards
Centre Colonels football coaches
Mississippi State Bulldogs football coaches
Tennessee Volunteers football players
Texas Tech Red Raiders athletic directors
Texas Tech Red Raiders football coaches
Tulsa Golden Hurricane football coaches
People from Daphne, Alabama
Players of American football from Nashville, Tennessee
Sportspeople from Nashville, Tennessee